General elections were held in South Africa on 26 May 1948. They represented a turning point in the country's history, as despite receiving just under half of the votes cast, the United Party and its leader, incumbent Prime Minister Jan Smuts, were ousted by the Herenigde Nasionale Party (HNP) led by D. F. Malan, a Dutch Reformed cleric.

During the election campaign, both the UP and the HNP formed coalitions with smaller parties. The UP was aligned with the left-leaning Labour Party, while the Afrikaner Party sought to advance Afrikaner rights by allying with the HNP. By legislation relating to franchise requirements, very few people of coloured and Asian descent were able to vote in this election; Africans had been banned altogether since the late 1930s, with the limited number of Africans meeting electoral qualifications voting for seven "own" white MPs separately.

The HNP, realising that many White South Africans felt threatened by black political aspirations, pledged to implement a policy of strict racial segregation in all spheres of living. The Nationalists labelled this new system of social organisation "apartheid" ("apartness" or "separation"), the name by which it became universally known. The HNP also took advantage of white fear of black-on-white crime, and the HNP promised whites safety and security from black-on-white crime and violence.

In contrast to the HNP's consistent, straightforward platform, the UP supported vague notions of slowly integrating the different racial groups within South Africa. Furthermore, white dissatisfaction with domestic and economic problems in South Africa after World War II, the HNP's superior organisation, and electoral malapportionment that favoured rural areas (where the HNP were traditionally stronger) all proved to be significant challenges to the UP campaign.

The elections marked the onset of 46 years of National Party rule in South Africa.

Results
Together, the HNP and the Afrikaner Party won 79 seats in the House of Assembly against a combined total of 74 won by the UP and the Labour Party. By a quirk of the first-past-the-post system, the HNP won more seats, even though the UP received over eleven per cent more votes. The nationalist coalition subsequently formed a new government and ushered in the era of formal, legally binding apartheid. In 1951, the HNP and the Afrikaner Party merged, returning to the name National Party.

By province

Reasons for the National Party victory
One of the central issues facing the white electorate in the 1948 election was that of race. The United Party (UP) and the National Party (NP) presented voters with differing answers to questions relating to racial integration in South Africa. Smuts and his followers were in favour of a pragmatic approach, arguing that racial integration was inevitable and that the government should thus relax regulations which sought to prevent black people from moving into urban areas. Whilst still seeking to maintain white dominance, the UP argued in favour of gradually reforming the political system so that black South Africans could eventually, at some unspecified point in the future, exercise some sort of power in a racially integrated South Africa. In contrast to this seemingly vague ideology, the HNP advanced the notion of further strictly enforced segregation between races and the total disempowerment of black South Africans. There was a growing fear amongst Nationalist Afrikaners of black people taking their jobs, especially post Second World War. Rural to urban movement by blacks was to be discouraged. The UP position was supported by the Fagan Commission while the Sauer Commission informed the HNP's stance.
Another reason for D.F. Malan's success was the National Party's constant promotion of Jan Smuts to be similar to the British. Leading the United Party, Smuts proposed rather liberal policies, more out of necessity than kindness, in order to try be elected. However, he was attacked by the opposition as similar to the 'enemy' (in this case Britain), an attack to try to frighten white and Afrikaner voters into voting for Malan due to their hatred of Britain following the mining of gold in the Transvaal region, after its discovery in 1886. Other reasons along this line was Smuts' former role in working for Britain and his decision to help Britain in World War Two.
Arguably the most important reason for election success however, was the number of rural voters which voted for the National Party in 1948. Despite not receiving the majority vote and Smuts gaining 12% more votes, Malan benefited heavily from malapportionment. This allowed Malan to form a government by winning many small constituencies and gaining 5 more seats than the United Party in a narrow victory for the National Party.

Economic reasons 
The putative policy of apartheid proposed by the HNP served the economic interests of certain groups of white South Africans. Farmers from the northern portions of the country relied on cheap black labour to maximise profits while working-class whites living in urban areas feared the employment competition that would follow an urban influx of black South Africans. Many commercial and financial Afrikaner interests based on agriculture saw the value of apartheid in promoting growth in this sector. The UP failed to realise the enormous economic benefits of apartheid to these large and influential groups and did not prioritise segregation as much as the HNP.

Smuts and his cabinet were blamed for many of the hardships that occurred as a result of South Africa's participation in World War II. During the war, petrol was rationed by means of coupons, and bakeries were ordered not to bake white bread so as to conserve wheat. After the war, some of these measures continued, as South Africa exported food and other necessaries to Britain and the Netherlands. South Africa even provided Britain with a loan of 4 million ounces (110 metric tons) of gold. These measures caused local shortages of meat and the unavailability of white bread. The Smuts government was blamed for this, as well as for the rate of inflation and the government's dismal housing record. All these factors provided ammunition for the HNP.

Race and ethnicity 
As regards election tactics, the HNP was extremely adroit at exploiting white fears while campaigning in the 1948 election. Because the UP had seemed to take a fairly lukewarm stance towards both integration and segregation, the HNP was able to argue that a victory for the UP would ultimately lead to a black government in South Africa. HNP propaganda linked black political power to communism and socialism, an anathema to many white South Africans at the time. Slogans such as "Swart Gevaar" ("Black Peril"), "Rooi Gevaar" ("Red Peril"), "Die kaffer op sy plek" ("The Kaffir in his place"), and "Die koelies uit die land" ("The coolies out of the country") played upon and amplified white anxieties. Much was made of the fact that Smuts had developed a good working relationship with Joseph Stalin during World War II, when South Africa and the USSR were allies in the fight against Nazi Germany. Smuts had once remarked that he "doffs his cap to Stalin" and the HNP presented this remark as proof of Smuts's latent communist and socialist tendencies.

The Smuts government's controversial immigration program served to further inflame Afrikaner disquiet. Under this program, numerous British immigrants had moved to South Africa and were perceived to have taken homes and employment away from (white) South African citizens. Moreover, it was claimed that the intention behind such plans was to swamp the Afrikaners, who had a higher birth rate than the British diaspora, with British immigrants so that Afrikaners would be outnumbered at the polls in future elections.

In preparation for the 1948 election, the HNP moderated its stance on republicanism. Because of the immense and abiding national trauma, caused by the Anglo-Boer War, transforming South Africa into a republic and dissolving all ties between South Africa and the United Kingdom had been an important mission for earlier incarnations of the HNP. English speaking South Africans tended to favour a close relationship with the UK, and so the republican project became a source of conflict between the two largest white groups in South Africa. A staunchly pro-republic stance alienated moderate Afrikaners who had supported South Africa's participation in World War II and wished to achieve reconciliation between their own people and English speakers. When the HNP agreed to compromise its fiercely republican standpoint, conceding that South Africa should remain a Dominion in the Commonwealth, many Afrikaner UP supporters switched allegiance.

Rural/urban vote weighting 
Demarcation of electoral district boundaries favoured the HNP. Most of the 70 seats won by the National Party during the 1948 election were in rural areas, whereas most of the 65 seats won by the United Party were in the urban areas. According to the Constitution that South Africa had at the time, the constituencies in the rural areas were smaller than those in urban areas. This meant that there were more rural constituencies than urban ones. This was to the benefit of the National Party since it tended to do well in rural areas in terms of votes. Despite winning 140,000 fewer votes than the UP, the NP/AP coalition gained a plurality of seats in Parliament, and was able to enter into a coalition with the Afrikaner Party to form a majority government. It has been calculated that if rural and urban votes had been of equal value, the UP would have won 80 seats, the HNP/AP 60 seats, and other parties the remaining seats, thus giving the UP a majority outright and perhaps delaying or preventing apartheid from taking place.

Political organisation 
The UP at the time has been characterised as cumbersome and lacking vigor while the HNP displayed energy and superior organizational skills. World War II had a bonding effect on the UP and white South Africans generally. Once this external uniting force fell away, Smuts lost a great deal of control over the UP as more and more voters considered alternatives to his tired regime; humiliatingly, the Prime Minister lost his parliamentary seat (Standerton) to an HNP challenger. As can be seen from the final tally of seats, Smuts and his party proved unable to counter the many grievances raised by the HNP in an effective way, and this inability led to a narrow HNP victory.

After the 1948 election, the ruling coalition succeeded in fully enfranchising the mostly Afrikaans- and German-speaking voters in South West Africa, later known as Namibia upon independence in 1990; the result being that this gave the National Party more or less six reliable votes in parliament.

References

General elections  in South Africa
South Africa
General
Events associated with apartheid
May 1948 events in Africa